Carabus huangi is a species of black-coloured beetle from family Carabidae, that is endemic to Sichuan, China.

References

huangi
Beetles described in 1992
Endemic fauna of Sichuan